The Île Rousseau is an island and park in Geneva, situated in the middle of the Rhone. It was named after the philosopher Jean-Jacques Rousseau. On the island is a statue of Rousseau.

The island is connected to the shore by a bridge.

External links

Île Rousseau on Genève-tourisme.ch

Jean-Jacques Rousseau
Geography of Geneva
River islands of Switzerland
Rhône
Landforms of the canton of Geneva